Tatiana Vladimirovna Kopnina (November 11, 1921 – March 6, 2009) was a Soviet Russian painter and art teacher who lived and worked in Leningrad - Saint Petersburg. She is regarded as one of the representatives of the Leningrad school of painting, and is most known for her portrait paintings.

Biography 

Kopnina was born November 11, 1921, in Krasnoyarsk, East Siberia, Soviet Russia. In 1950 she graduated from Ilya Repin Institute in Mikhail Avilov workshop. She was a pupil of Alexander Zaytsev, Genrikh Pavlovsky, and Semion Abugov.

Beginning in 1949, Kopnina participated in art exhibitions. She painted portraits, genre scenes, landscapes, and still lifes. She had a solo art exhibition in Leningrad in 1985.

Kopnina became a member of the Saint Petersburg Union of Artists in 1950. From 1960 to 1990 she worked as an art teacher in the Secondary Art School of Repin Institute of Arts in Leningrad.

Kopnina died on March 6, 2009, in Saint Petersburg. Her paintings are in museums and private collections in Russia, Japan, the U.S., China, and other countries.

See also
 Leningrad School of Painting
 List of Russian artists
 List of 20th-century Russian painters
 List of painters of Saint Petersburg Union of Artists
 List of the Russian Landscape painters
 Saint Petersburg Union of Artists

References

Bibliography 
 Directory of members of the Leningrad branch of Union of Artists of Russian Federation. - Leningrad: Khudozhnik RSFSR, 1987. - p. 61.
 Matthew C. Bown. Dictionary of 20th Century Russian and Soviet Painters 1900-1980s. - London: Izomar, 1998. , .
 Vern G. Swanson. Soviet Impressionism. - Woodbridge, England: Antique Collectors' Club, 2001. - pp. 20–21. , .
 Sergei V. Ivanov. Unknown Socialist Realism. The Leningrad School.- Saint Petersburg: NP-Print Edition, 2007. – pp. 362, 388-394, 397, 398, 403, 405, 406. , .
 Anniversary Directory graduates of Saint Petersburg State Academic Institute of Painting, Sculpture, and Architecture named after Ilya Repin, Russian Academy of Arts. 1915 - 2005. - Saint Petersburg: Pervotsvet Publishing House, 2007.- p. 62.  .

External links 

 Art works and Biography of Tatiana Kopnina in ARKA Fine Art Gallery

1921 births
2009 deaths
20th-century Russian painters
21st-century Russian painters
Soviet painters
Socialist realist artists
Russian women painters
Members of the Leningrad Union of Artists
Leningrad School artists
Leningrad Secondary Art School alumni
Repin Institute of Arts alumni
20th-century Russian women artists
21st-century Russian women artists